Stade Bergeyre is a former sports stadium in northeast of Paris, France, located in 19th district of the French capital. Built in August 1918, with financial support of Jacques Sigrand. Its capacity was approximately 15,000, and the name comes from the name of a French rugby player, who died in First World War.

Bergeyre stadium was mainly used for football games, and was home of the Olympique Paris team. Also, rugby, track and field and various other activities (e.g. circus) took place there. In 1924, several football and rugby games of the Olympic Games took place here. However, just two years later, it was demolished because the city of Paris, which was quickly growing, needed space for housing.

References
1924 Summer Olympics official report. pp. 318, 320. 

Venues of the 1924 Summer Olympics
Defunct sports venues in France
Demolished buildings and structures in France
Olympic football venues
Multi-purpose stadiums in France
Sports venues completed in 1918